Children of Paradise (original French title: Les Enfants du Paradis) is a two-part French romantic drama film by Marcel Carné, produced under war conditions in 1943, 1944, and early 1945 in both Vichy France and Occupied France. Set in the theatrical world of 1830s Paris, it tells the story of a courtesan and four men — a mime, an actor, a criminal and an aristocrat — who love her in entirely different ways.

It has received universal critical acclaim. "I would give up all my films to have Les Enfants du Paradis", said nouvelle vague director François Truffaut. In Truman Capote's The Duke in His Domain (1957), actor Marlon Brando called it "maybe the best movie ever made." Its original American trailer positioned it as the French answer to Gone With the Wind (1939), an opinion shared by critic David Shipman. A 1995 vote by 600 French critics and professionals named it the "Best Film Ever".

Title
As noted by one critic, "in French, 'paradis' is the colloquial name for the gallery or second balcony in a theatre, where common people sat and viewed a play, responding to it honestly and boisterously. The actors played to these gallery gods, hoping to win their favour, the actor himself thus being elevated to an Olympian status." The film contains many shots of the audience hanging over the edge of these balconies (which are similarly known as "the gods" in the British theatre), and screenwriter Jacques Prévert stated that the title "refers to the actors ... and the audiences too, the good-natured, working-class audience." In British English, Les Enfants du Paradis translates better in context as The Children of the Gods than as The Children of Paradise.

Story

Précis
Children of Paradise is set in the theatrical world of Paris during the July Monarchy (1830–1848), centred on the area around the Funambules theatre, situated on the Boulevard du Temple – pejoratively referred to as the "Boulevard du Crime". The film revolves around a beautiful and charismatic courtesan, Garance (Arletty). Four men – the mime Baptiste Deburau (Jean-Louis Barrault), the actor Frédérick Lemaître (Pierre Brasseur), the thief Pierre François Lacenaire (Marcel Herrand), and the aristocrat Édouard de Montray (Louis Salou) – are in love with Garance, and their intrigues drive the story forward. Garance is briefly intrigued/involved with them all, but leaves them when they attempt to force her to love on their terms, rather than her own. The mime Baptiste is the one who suffers the most in pursuit of the unattainable Garance.

Story sources
The four men courting Garance are all based on real French personalities of the 1820s and 1830s. Baptiste Deburau was a famous mime and Frédérick Lemaître was an acclaimed actor on the "Boulevard of Crime" depicted in the film. Pierre Lacenaire was an infamous French criminal, and the fictional character of the Comte Édouard de Montray was inspired by the Duc de Morny.

The idea for making a movie based on these characters came from a chance meeting between Carné and Jean-Louis Barrault, in Nice, during which Barrault pitched the idea of making a movie based on Deburau and Lemaître.  Carné, who at the time was hesitant about which movie to direct next, proposed this idea to his friend Jacques Prévert.  Prévert was initially reluctant to write a movie about a mime, "Jacques hated pantomime" his brother once said, but Barrault assured Prévert, that he and his teacher Étienne Decroux, who plays Baptiste's father in the film, would take responsibility for developing the mime sequences. According to Trauner Prévert then saw an opportunity to include the character of Lacenaire, the "dandy du crime", who fascinated him. The Germans were then occupying the whole of France, and Prévert is rumoured to have said "They will not let me do a movie about Lacenaire, but I can put Lacenaire in a film about Deburau". The script incorporates quotations from Lacenaire's autobiography.

Plot summary
Children of Paradise is divided into two parts, Boulevard du Crime ("Boulevard of Crime") and L'Homme Blanc ("The Man in White"). The first begins around 1827, the second about seven years later. The action takes place mainly in the neighbourhood of the Boulevard du Temple in Paris, nicknamed "Boulevard of Crime" because of all the melodramas and bloody scenarios offered to the largely plebeian public each evening. There are two principal theatres: the Théâtre des Funambules ("Theatre of Tightrope Walkers") specializes in pantomime, since the authorities do not allow it to use spoken dialogue, which is reserved for the "official" venue, the Grand Theatre.

Part I: Boulevard of Crime
A young actor and womaniser, Frédérick Lemaître, dreams of becoming a star. He meets and flirts with Garance, a beautiful woman who earns her living by modestly exhibiting her physical charms in a carnival show. Garance staves off Frédérick's advances and goes to visit one of her acquaintances, Pierre-François Lacenaire, a rebel in revolt against society. Lacenaire is a proud, dangerous individual who works as a scrivener to cover his organized criminal enterprises. Shortly thereafter, Garance is accused of stealing a man's gold watch while she is watching a pantomime featuring Baptiste Deburau and a barker (Baptiste's father) in front of the Funambules Theatre. Lacenaire is in fact the guilty party. Baptiste, dressed up as the stock character Pierrot, saves her from the police by silently acting out the theft, which he has just witnessed. He reveals a great talent, a veritable vocation for pantomime, but falls immediately and irremediably in love with Garance, saving a flower she thanked him with. In the background, there is a price list for various seats, including Paradise, which is visible over the mime's shoulder.

Baptiste's father is one of the stars at the Funambules. The daughter of the theatre director, Nathalie, who is a mime also, is deeply in love with Baptiste. Before the performance that evening, a used-clothes peddler named Jéricho reads in her palm that she will marry the man she loves, as he knew her father was worried about her mood affecting her performances. When a fight breaks out that evening between two rival clans of actors, Baptiste and Frédérick manage to calm the crowd down by improvising a mime act, thus saving the day's receipts. The most enthusiastic of the spectators are those seated in "paradise" (paradis), a term denoting in French theatrical language the top floor of the balcony, where the cheapest seats are located.

Later that night, Baptiste catches sight of Garance with Lacenaire and his accomplices in a seedy restaurant/dancehall, "Le Rouge Gorge" (a pun: this means "The Robin" or "The Red Breast", but literally translates as "The Red Throat", a reference to the previous owner's throat having been slit). When he invites Garance to dance, he is thrown out of the restaurant by Avril, one of Lacenaire's thugs. He turns the situation around and leaves with Garance, for whom he finds a room at the same boarding house where he and Frédérick live. After declaring his love, Baptiste flees Garance's room when she says she doesn't feel the same way, despite her clear invitation to stay. When Frédérick hears Garance singing in her room, which is next to his, he quickly joins her.

Baptiste becomes the star of the Funambules; fuelled by his passion, he writes several very popular pantomimes, performing with Garance and Frédérick, who have become lovers. Baptiste is tormented by their affair, while Nathalie, who is convinced that she and Baptiste are "made for each other", suffers from his lack of love for her.

Garance is visited in her dressing room by the Count Édouard de Montray, a wealthy and cynical dandy who offers her his fortune if she will agree to become his mistress. Garance is repelled by him and mockingly rejects his proposition. The count nonetheless offers her his protection if the need were to arise. She is later unjustly suspected of complicity in an abortive robbery and murder attempt by Lacenaire and Avril. To avoid arrest she is forced to appeal to Count Édouard for protection. The first part of the film comes to an end with this development.

Part II: The Man in White
Several years later, Frédérick has become famous as the star of the Grand Theatre. A man about town and a spendthrift, he is covered with debts – which doesn't prevent him from devastating the mediocre play in which he currently has the main role by exposing it to ridicule in rehearsal and then playing it for laughs, rather than straight melodrama, on opening night. Despite achieving a smashing success, the play's three fussy authors are still outraged and challenge him to a duel. He accepts and when he returns to his dressing room, Frédérick is confronted by Lacenaire, who apparently intends to rob and kill him. However, the criminal is an amateur playwright and strikes up a friendship with the actor instead. He and Avril serve as Frédérick's seconds the next morning, when the actor arrives at the duel dead drunk.

Baptiste is enjoying even greater success as a mime at the Funambules. When Frédérick goes to a performance the day after surviving the duel, he is surprised to find himself in the same box as Garance. His old flame has returned to Paris after having travelled throughout the world with the Count de Montray, who has kept her these several years. She has been attending the Funambules every night incognito to watch Baptiste perform. She knows she has always been genuinely in love with him. Frédérick suddenly finds himself jealous for the first time in his life. While the feeling is highly unpleasant, he remarks that his jealousy will help him as an actor. He will finally be able to play the role of Othello, having now experienced the emotions which motivate the character. Garance asks Frédérick to tell Baptiste of her presence, but Nathalie, now Baptiste's wife, is first informed by the spiteful rag-man Jéricho. She sends their small son to Garance's box to mortify her with their family's happiness. By the time Frédérick alerts Baptiste and he rushes to find her, the box is empty.

When Garance returns to the Count's luxurious mansion, she finds Lacenaire waiting for her. Lacenaire satisfies himself that Garance has no love for him and, on his way out, encounters the Count, who is irritated to see such an individual in his home. Lacenaire reacts to the Count's challenge with threats, revealing the knife at his belt. Later, Garance declares to the Count that she will never love him since she is already in love with another man, but declares she will continue to try to please him, and offers to spread the word on the streets that she is "mad" about him, if he would like.

Frédérick has finally achieved his dream of playing the role of Othello. The Count, who insists on attending the performance with Garance, is convinced that the actor is the man she loves. At a break in the play, the Count coolly mocks Frédérick, trying to provoke him into a duel. Elsewhere Baptiste, who is also in the audience, encounters Garance at last. When Lacenaire takes Frédérick's side in the verbal jousting, the Count attempts to humiliate him as well. Lacenaire takes revenge by calling him a cuckold and, dramatically pulling back a curtain, reveals Garance in Baptiste's embrace on the balcony. The two lovers slip away to spend the night together in Garance's former room at the Great Post House.

The next morning, at a Turkish bath, Lacenaire assassinates the Count. He then calmly sits to wait for the police and meet his "destiny", which is to die on the scaffold. At the rooming house, Nathalie walks in on Baptiste and Garance. Garance is in a hurry to exit in order to prevent the duel between Frédérick and the Count, whom she is unaware has been murdered, but Nathalie blocks her way, insisting that leaving is easy, while to stay and share someone's everyday life, as she has for the past six years with Baptiste, is more powerful. Garance responds that she has lived with Baptiste for six years as well, that she felt him every day and night even though she was with another. Nathalie dismisses Garance's experience as unimportant and moves past her to Baptiste, allowing Garance to leave. Nathalie pleads with Baptiste for reassurance as he attempts to follow Garance. Baptiste pushes past her and is soon lost in the frantic Carnival crowd amid a sea of bobbing masks and unheeding, white Pierrots. The film ends as a desperate Baptiste is swept away with the crowd and Garance leaves in her carriage, her face impassive. The crowd that brought Garance and Baptiste together in the opening scene pulls them apart.

Cast

Production
The film was made under extremely difficult conditions. External sets in Nice were badly damaged by natural causes, exacerbated and compounded by the theatrical constraints during the German occupation of France during World War II. The film was split into two parts because the distributor, Gaumont, could only screen a three hour film half as many times as usual. By making the film a pseudo double feature, the distributor could charge eighty-francs per admission, double the usual amount, therefore making up the shortfall. Barrault was committed to the premiere production of The Satin Slipper (Le Soulier de satin), which was a hit, and almost offered his role to a music hall entertainer, Jacques Tati, then little known, before a schedule was negotiated which allowed him to fulfil both roles.

Film critic Pauline Kael wrote that, allegedly, "the starving extras made away with some of the banquets before they could be photographed".  Many of the 1,800 extras were Resistance agents using the film as daytime cover, who, until the liberation, had to mingle with some collaborators or Vichy sympathisers who were imposed on the production by the authorities. Alexandre Trauner, who designed the sets, and Joseph Kosma, who composed the music, were Jewish and had to work in secrecy throughout the production.  Music was provided by the Orchestre de la Société des Concerts du Conservatoire under the direction of renowned conductor, Charles Münch, who personally contributed part of his income to the French Resistance.  Trauner lived (under an assumed name) with Carné and Prévert during the six months it took them to prepare the script. Maurice Thiriet, Kosma's orchestrator, acted as his front.

The set builders were short of supplies and the camera crew's film stock was rationed. The financing, originally a French-Italian production, collapsed a few weeks after production began in Nice, due to the Allied conquest of Sicily in August 1943. Around this time, the Nazis forbade the producer, André Paulvé, from working on the film because of his remote Jewish ancestry, and the production had to be suspended for three months. The French film company Pathé took over production, whose cost was escalating wildly. The quarter-mile long main set, the "Boulevard du Temple", was severely damaged by a storm and had to be rebuilt. By the time shooting resumed in Paris in early spring of 1944, the director of photography, Roger Hubert, had been assigned to another production and Philippe Agostini, who replaced him, had to analyse all the reels in order to match the lighting of the non-sequential shot list; all the while, electricity in the Paris Studios was intermittent.

The movie also marks the first artistic collaboration between Carné and the French painter and costume designer Mayo, one that would continue over several films (Les Portes de la Nuit (1946), La Fleur de l'Age (1947), Juliette ou la Clef des Songes, Thérèse Raquin (1953), Les Tricheurs (1958)). This friend of Prévert started his work on the project very early on in order to immerse himself fully in the script and the characters. The materials, provided by Jeanne Lanvin, allowed work on the costumes to be done in very favourable conditions given the difficult period of the French occupation.

Production was delayed again after the Allies landed in Normandy, perhaps intentionally stalled so that it would only be completed after the French liberation. When Paris was liberated in August 1944, the actor Robert Le Vigan, cast in the role of informer-thief Jéricho, was sentenced to death by the Resistance for collaborating with the Nazis, and had to flee, along with author Céline, to Sigmaringen. He was replaced at a moment's notice by Pierre Renoir, older brother of French filmmaker Jean Renoir and son of the famous painter, and most of the scenes had to be redone. Le Vigan was tried and convicted as a Nazi collaborator in 1946. One scene featuring Le Vigan survives in the middle of the second part, when Jericho snitches to Nathalie. Carné and Prévert had hidden some of the key reels of film from the occupying forces, hoping that the liberation of Paris would have occurred when the film was ready for release.

Reception
The film was the third most popular film at the French box-office in 1945. Rotten Tomatoes, a review aggregator, reports that 97% of 38 surveyed critics gave the film a positive review; with an average rating of 9.2/10. The site's consensus reads: "Strong performances abound, and Carne's wit and grace are evident in this masterful (if long) French epic." The film critic Roger Ebert added it to his "Great Movie" collection in 2002. Children of Paradise was included in Time magazine's 2005 All-Time 100 list of the greatest films made since 1923. Jacques Prévert's screenplay was nominated for the Oscar for Best Original Screenplay at the 19th Academy Awards. It isn't clear which version of the film was honoured; the U.S. release of the film has been described as "a 144-min., inadequately-subtitled one released in New York in 1947."

Release versions
The film had its premiere in Paris, at the Chaillot Palace on 9 March 1945, in its entirety. Carné then had to fight with the producers to have the film shown exclusively in two theatres (Madeleine and Colisée) instead of one and in its entirety and without an intermission. He also pioneered the idea of the public being able to reserve their seats in advance. The producers accepted Carné's demands on the condition that they be able to charge double the price of admittance. Children of Paradise became an instant and monumental success, remaining on the screen of the Madeleine Theatre for 54 weeks.

Restoration
In March 2012, Pathé released a new restoration of the film. This involved scanning the badly damaged original camera negative, and other early sources, using a high-resolution 4K digital process to produce a new master print. This restoration was released on Blu-ray Disc in September 2012.

References

Citations

Other sources
 Turk, Edward Baron (1989), Child of Paradise: Marcel Carné and the Golden Age of French Cinema (Series: Harvard Film Studies), Cambridge, Massachusetts: Harvard University Press.

External links

 
 
 
 
 Children of Paradise on Marcel Carné's website 
 "Reflections on Les Enfants du Paradis (Children of Paradise)" by Stuart Fernie
 Enfants du Paradis Filmographie Pathé
 The Romance of Children of Paradise an essay by Dudley Andrew at the Criterion Collection

1945 films
1945 romantic drama films
French romantic drama films
Romantic epic films
Romantic period films
Films set in a theatre
Films set in Paris
Films set in the 1820s
Films set in the 1830s
Films directed by Marcel Carné
Films produced by Raymond Borderie
Films with screenplays by Jacques Prévert
Fictional mimes
French black-and-white films
1940s French-language films
1940s French films